The National Society for Earthquake Technology - Nepal (NSET) is a Nepali non-governmental organization working on reducing earthquake risk and increasing earthquake preparedness in Nepal as well as other earthquake-prone countries.

History
NSET was founded on June 18, 1993 and registered at the District Administration Office, Kathmandu on April 28, 1994 and at the Social Welfare Council on August 10, 1998.

Purpose
NSET was founded with the vision of "Earthquake Safe Communities in Nepal by 2020".

Activities
In order to combat the growing risks posed by a devastating earthquake in Nepal in the near future, NSET seeks to make builders and citizens aware of affordable construction techniques that can significantly reduce seismic risk. Currently, 80 per cent of new buildings in Nepal are built informally, without engineering expertise. NSET's activities target the informal builders of such edifices: the organisation conducts demonstrations using a 'Shake Table', a tool that shows the effects of an earthquake on scale models of two buildings, one built using traditional methods and one incorporating earthquake engineering. The Shake Table demonstration has been given to builders, masons, engineers, policy makers and health and disaster response personnel and is now being used in India, Afghanistan, and Tajikistan as well.

NSET also retrofits schools and other buildings in Nepal to make them more earthquake proof and runs earthquake drills for organisations such as hospitals, to allow them to perfect their disaster response techniques.

Association Memberships
NSET is a founding member of the following associations:
Asian Disaster Reduction and Response Network (ADRRN)
Coalition for Global School Safety (COGSS)
Disaster Preparedness Network Nepal (DPNet)
International Live Lessons Transfer Network (TeLLNet)

NSET is also a member of the following associations:
International Association for Earthquake Engineering (IAEE)
World Seismic Safety Initiative (WSSI)
Kirtipur Volunteer Society

See also
 1934 Nepal–Bihar earthquake
 1988 Nepal earthquake
 Disaster risk reduction
 Earthquake engineering
 Seismic retrofit
 Seismic risk
 Society of Nepali Architects

References

Further reading
Bothara, J. K.; Guragain, R.; Dixit, A. (2002). "Protection of Educational Buildings Against Earthquakes: a Manual for Designers and Builders", National Society for Earthquake Technology - Nepal (NSET). 

Macabuag, J.; Guragain, R.; Bhattacharya, S. (2012). "Seismic retrofitting of non-engineered masonry in rural Nepal". Proceedings of the ICE - Structures and Buildings, Volume 65 Issue 6, January 2012, pp. 273–286.

External links
 National Society for Earthquake Technology - Nepal (NSET) Website
 National Society for Earthquake Technology - Nepal (NSET) Twitter Account
 National Society for Earthquake Technology - Nepal (NSET) Facebook Page

Scientific organizations established in 1993
Earthquakes in Nepal
Earthquake engineering
Scientific organisations based in Nepal
1993 establishments in Nepal